The 2022–23 season is Associazione Calcio Monzas first season in the Serie A, the first level of Italian football, following their promotion in the 2021–22 season. They also participated in the Coppa Italia, the Italian domestic cup.

Pre-season and friendlies
Monza played six pre-season friendly games in July 2022.

Results list Monza's goal tally first.

Serie A

Matches 
 Results list Monza's goal tally first.

League table

Coppa Italia 

Monza entered the round of 64 in the Coppa Italia, and played at home against Serie B side Frosinone on 7 August 2022. They won 3–2, via two first-half penalty goals, and advanced to the round of 32 against Serie A side Udinese.
Results list Monza's goal tally first.

Player details 

|}

Transfers

Summer

Winter

Notes

References

External links
  

A.C. Monza seasons
Monza